Huby may refer to:
Huby (surname)
Huby, Hambleton
Huby, Harrogate
Huby, Kuyavian-Pomeranian Voivodeship (north-central Poland)
Huby, Łódź Voivodeship (central Poland)
Huby, Silesian Voivodeship (south Poland)
Huby, part of the Nowe Miasto district of Poznań (west Poland)
Huby, osiedle in Wrocław (south-west Poland)